Dodge City station is a train station in Dodge City, Kansas, United States served by Amtraks Southwest Chief train. From 2015 to 2019 the station has consistently been the fifth-most-frequented Amtrak station in Kansas.

The original station structure was built by the Atchison, Topeka and Santa Fe Railway in 1896 to a design by architect James C. Holland and Company, a Topeka firm, in the Richardsonian Romanesque architectural style. Dodge City's importance as a division point on the railroad, with yards, a roundhouse and shops, and as the last significant rest stop for westbound passengers before a large undeveloped region, led the railroad to build a large structure with a Harvey House lunchroom and dining room.

The station was added to and remodeled several times in the style of the original structure. An addition was made between 1907 and 1909 to the first and second floors on the west end to add hotel rooms. An addition built between 1912 and 1914 to first and second floors of the east end added railway employee offices and sleeping spaces, and expanded the Harvey House lunchroom and dining room. The north facade was changed and a basement added for Harvey House food preparation and storage between 1924 and 1925. The station is of two stories with a three-story center section, constructed of stone, red-brick and terra cotta. 
The station was added to the National Register of Historic Places in 2000 for its historical significance in the growth of Dodge City and its association with the Atchison, Topeka and Santa Fe, and for its architectural significance as the finest example of Romanesque design in Dodge City. The station has been renovated and restored, and is also used as a theater and for other recreational, cultural, and social uses.

See also 
List of Amtrak stations

References

External links

Southwest Chief route guide
Dodge City Amtrak Station (USA Rail Guide -- Train Web)
El Vaquero Hotel (Fred Harvey Collection)
ATSF Dodge City, Kansas Depot (Surviving Santa Fe Depots)

Amtrak stations in Kansas
Atchison, Topeka and Santa Fe Railway stations
Railway stations in the United States opened in 1896
Railway stations on the National Register of Historic Places in Kansas
Buildings and structures in Dodge City, Kansas
National Register of Historic Places in Ford County, Kansas